Heroes is the third studio album by American country music artist Paul Overstreet. The album was released by RCA Nashville in 1991. The album reached #17 on Billboard's Top Country Albums chart and charted at #21 on the Top Christian Albums chart. This album produced three top ten singles including Overstreet's first and only number 1 song, "Daddy's Come Around". Other singles and their peaks on the chart were "Heroes" (#4), "Ball and Chain" (#5), "If I Could Bottle This Up" (#30), and "Billy Can't Read" (#57).

Content
Paul Overstreet wrote or co-wrote every track on the album, most of them with Don Schlitz. Fellow country artists Pam Tillis and Trisha Yearwood sing background vocals as well as Christian Music singer Chris Rodriguez. On the LP release of the album, the songs "I'm So Glad I was Dreaming" and "Straight and Narrow" were not included, leaving the album with nine tracks.

Track listing

Personnel
As listed in liner notes.
 Mike Brignardello - bass guitar
 Paul Franklin - pedal steel guitar, lap steel guitar, pedabro
 Steve Gibson - acoustic guitar, mandolin
 Rob Hajacos - fiddle
 Christopher Harris - background vocals
 Shane Keister - keyboards
 Jana King - background vocals
 Janie Lambert - background vocals
 Paul Leim - drums
 Terry McMillan - percussion, harmonica, tambourine
 Jerry McPherson - electric guitar, tremolo guitar, E-bow, gut string guitar
 Mark O'Connor - fiddle
 Paul Overstreet - lead vocals, background vocals
 Don Potter - acoustic guitar
 Chris Rodriguez - background vocals
 Lisa Silver - background vocals
 Pam Tillis - background vocals
 Bergen White - background vocals
 Bob Wray - bass guitar
 Trisha Yearwood - background vocals
 Reggie Young - electric guitar

Charts

Weekly charts

Year-end charts

Sources

1991 albums
Paul Overstreet albums
Albums produced by Brown Bannister
RCA Records albums